Mick Coughlan is an Irish retired hurler who played as a centre-back for the Offaly senior team.

Born in Clareen, County Offaly, Coughlan first played competitive hurling in his youth. He made his senior debut with Offaly during the 1982-83 National League and immediately became a regular member of the team. During his career Coughlan won one All-Ireland medal and three Leinster medals. Mick played centre back when Offaly beat Wexford in the 1988 Leinster Hurling Championship Final.

His retirement came during the 1988-89 National League.

Honours

Team

Seir Kieran
Offaly Senior Hurling Championship (4): 1988, 1995, 1996, 1998.

Offaly
All-Ireland Senior Hurling Championship (1): 1985 (sub)
Leinster Senior Hurling Championship (3): 1984, 1985 ,1988

References

Living people
Seir Kieran hurlers
Offaly inter-county hurlers
Year of birth missing (living people)